Ján Orosch (born 28 May 1953, Bratislava) is a Roman Catholic prelate currently serving as the Archbishop of Trnava.

Biography
After graduating, he was ordained to the priesthood by bishop Julius Gábriš on 6 June 1976 in Bratislava. He worked Komarno, Bušince, Okoč (1982), Hodruša-Hámre (1983), Vyškovce Ipľom(1984), Nové Zámky(1990), Bratislava-Prievoz (1991), Bratislava-Čunovo (1992).

Pope John Paul II on 2 April 2004 appointed him Auxiliary Bishop of Bratislava-Trnava and the titular bishop of Semina. received his episcopal ordination on 2 May 2004, together with today's Archbishop Stanislav Zvolenský in the Cathedral of SS. John the Baptist in Trnava.

On 2 July 2012 Pope Benedict XVI appointed him apostolic administrator after  Archbishop Róbert Bezák was dismissed from the Archdiocese of Trnava. On 11 July 2013 Pope Francis named him Apostolic Administrator for Archbishop of Trnava.

In November 2022, Orosch questioned the innocence of the two victims of a terrorist attack outside a gay bar in Bratislava. His comments were condemned by Slovakian President Zuzana Čaputová and Prime Minister Eduard Heger among others. He later apologized for the comments.

References

1953 births
21st-century Roman Catholic bishops in Slovakia
People from Trnava
Clergy from Bratislava
Living people